Donald James "Danny" Wilson (4 November 1955) is a Welsh former rugby union and professional rugby league footballer who played in the 1970s and 1980s. A Wales international , he played his club rugby for Widnes, Barrow, Swinton, Runcorn Highfield and Springfield Borough.

Career
Born in Wales to a Sierra Leone Creole father and a Welsh mother, Wilson played rugby union for Cardiff RFC as a fly-half before moving north to play as a professional in rugby league.

Wilson once scored five drop goals in a match for Swinton.

Wilson won five caps for Wales while at Swinton, in 1981–82 and 1984.

Family
Wilson is the father of former footballer and Wales manager Ryan Giggs, who was christened Ryan Joseph Wilson but as a teenager changed his surname to that of his mother. Giggs is said to have inherited his balance and athleticism from his father.

References

External links
(archived by web.archive.org) Swinton Lions > Club >  A Barking 8ief History
Statistics at rugby.widnes.tv
Widnes v Warrington – Sunday 20 March 1977

1955 births
Living people
Blackpool Borough players
British people of Sierra Leone Creole descent
People of Sierra Leone Creole descent
Footballers who switched code
Liverpool City (rugby league) players
Rugby league five-eighths
Rugby league players from Cwmbran
Rugby union fly-halves
Rugby union players from Cwmbran
Swinton Lions players
Wales national rugby league team players
Welsh people of Sierra Leonean descent
British sportspeople of Sierra Leonean descent
Welsh rugby league players
Welsh rugby union players
Widnes Vikings players